Adi Carauleanu (born 8 March 1957) is a Romanian actor known for his roles in The Paper Will Be Blue (2006) and Cristian Mungiu's Palme d'Or-winning 2007 film 4 Months, 3 Weeks and 2 Days.

Born in Calafat, Dolj County, Carauleanu completed his studies at the Institute of Theatre and Cinema Art in Bucharest in 1981. From 1996 to 2015, he served as the artistic director at Iași National Theatre.

References

1957 births
Living people
People from Calafat
Caragiale National University of Theatre and Film alumni
Romanian male film actors
Romanian male stage actors